Sheermal (Persian/Urdu:), also spelled shirmal, is a saffron-flavored traditional flatbread eaten in Iran and the Indian subcontinent. The word sheermal is derived from the Persian words شیر (translit. sheer) meaning milk, and مالیدن (translit. malidan) meaning to rub. In a literal translation, sheermal means milk rubbed. Originating in Persia, it was introduced to North India by the Mughal emperors during the medieval period. It became a delicacy of Lucknow, Hyderabad and Aurangabad. It is also part of the Awadhi cuisine and is enjoyed in Old Bhopal and Pakistan.

Preparation

Shirmal is a mildly sweet naan made out of maida, leavened with yeast, baked in a tandoor or oven. Shirmal was traditionally made like roti. Today, shirmal is prepared like naan. The warm water in the recipe for naan roti was replaced with warm milk sweetened with sugar and flavored with saffron and cardamom. The final product resembles Danish pastry.

In Iran, there are slight regional variations in the preparation of sheermal. As such, it is sometimes sold as a souvenir when travelling between the regions.

In India, especially in the city of Lucknow, shirmal is sometimes served with kababs, tikkia, or alongside nihari.

See also

 List of Indian breads

References

Indian breads
Pakistani breads
Iranian breads
Indian cuisine
Mughlai cuisine
bn:শিরমাল